Corsicans, coming mainly from the regions of Cap Corse and La Castagniccia in the mediterranean island of Corsica, started arriving in the first third of the 19th century and settled mainly in the coastal towns of Carúpano and Rio Caribe. Known locally as Los Corsos, Corsicans played a central role in the development of the cocoa and rum industry in Venezuela. Around the 1950s many Corsican families left Paria and settled in Caracas, and have been active in politics, commerce, medicine and the arts.

Historical background

The first Corsicans to settle in Venezuela were sailors and missionaries, who moved from the island when was part of the Italian Republic of Genoa, in the sixteenth and seventeenth centuries.

During the reign of Napoleon III Corsica suffered a decline in agricultural production (particularly in the wine, olive and chestnut industries) due to unfair trade practices imposed by France. That coupled with a population boom due to the eradication of malaria in coastal areas, forced many Corsican families to emigrate to the Caribbean.

The first wave of Corsicans arrived in the Venezuelan region of Paria around 1830. Antonio Oletta, Francisco and Cayetano Morandi, José Vicente Franceschi and Juan Bautista Lucca were some of the first Corsicans to settle in the town of Carúpano. Once in Paria, many Corsicans founded cocoa exporting firms, most notable being that of the Franceschi & Co, established in 1830 and still existing today, making it one of Venezuela's oldest companies.

There were two other significant waves of immigration at the end the 19th century. While most of them went to Carúpano, where there was already a well established Corsican-Venezuelan community, others settled in the towns of Barcelona and Ciudad Bolivar. The Corsos controlled the Venezuelan cocoa bean trade and modernized many of the towns where they lived.

In 1876, four companies -Franceschi & Cia., Massiani & Cia., Lucca & Cia. and Raffalli Bros., represented almost 90% of the export of cocoa carried out during that year. Nearly half a century later, in 1921, five companies -Franceschi & Cia., Prosperi & Cia. (founded 1890), Antoni Brothers, Benedetti, Vicentelli y Santelli & Cia. (founded 1889) and Raffalli Brothers still represented 80% of the export trade for cocoa from Carúpano. (Harwich Vallenilla, Nikita. La red comercial corsa. 1991).
On 01.18.1870, the company « Compañia Minera Anonima El Callao » was founded by Liccioni & Cagninacci (cf Acta de Fundacion, en sesion de 6 de Marzo de 1883).

The port facilities, road improvements and a telegraph cable that connected Carúpano with Marseille were some of the projects put forward by the Corsicans in Carúpano.

During the turbulent dictatorship of General Cipriano Castro (1899-1908), the value of agricultural production contracted by 52%, the year of the economic blockade of the great European powers due to default on foreign debt. In 1908, accusing the opposition to his regime, General Castro massively expelled Corsican producers and traders established in and around Carúpano.

Distinguished Venezuelans of Corsican Descent

 Rafael Agostini Hospedales (1808-1881), writer and lawyer
Olga Antonetti (1945-1968), Miss Venezuela 1962
Diego Arria Salicetti (born 1938), economist, diplomat, polítician
Josefina Benedetti (born 1955),composer 
Oscar Benedetti Pietri (1926 - 2021), engineer  
Ernesto  Branger Orzattoni (1853-1926), entrepreneur
 Aimée Battistini (1916-1989), painter
Aristides Calvani (1918-1986), politician and lawyer 
Aníbal Dominici (1837-1897), politician and lawyer
Santos Dominici (1869-1954), physician 
 Alberto Franceschi (born 1949), politician and businessman
Arturo Hernández Grisanti (1927 – 2008) – writer, politician
 Arturo Uslar Pietri  (1906 – 2001) – writer, intellectual, political thinker, winner of the Prince of Asturias Award
 Raúl Leoni  (1905 -1972) – President of Venezuela, 1964–1969
 Jaime Lusinchi  (May 27, 1924 – May 21, 2014) – President of Venezuela, 1984–1989
 Antonio Liccioni (1817 - 1901), gold miner entrepreneur of El Callao
Juan Liscano (1915-2001), poet, writer, folklorist, editor
 Francisco Massiani (1944 - 2019), writer
 Ascanio Negretti (1897 - 1949), violinist
Ángel Santos Palazzi (1877 - 1916), militar
Alicia Pietri (1923 - 2011), public figure who twice served as First Lady of Venezuela (1969–1974 and 1994–1999)
  Luis Geronimo Pietri (1892 - 1969), politician, diplomat and lawyer
 Berenice Perrone (born 1936), singer and actress
 Bartolomé Tavera Acosta (1865-1931) Historian, ethnologist, linguist and journalist
Leon Santelli, rum Master
Espartaco Santoni (1937-1998), actor
Leopoldo Sucre Figarella (1926-1996), politician
 Jose Felix Oletta, physician and politician
Luis Augusto Vegas Benedetti (1935-2006), trader and politician
José Antonio Velutini (1844-1912), militar
Luis Emilio Velutini (born 1953), businessman

See also

Corsican people
Corsican immigration to Puerto Rico
History of Venezuela
List of Corsicans
Italians in Venezuela

External links
 Puerto Rican and Venezuelan Connections, Corsica Isula
 Venezuela y la inmigracion corsa
Between America and Europe

Corsican diaspora
Demographics of Venezuela
History of Corsica